Lessons in Conduct (French: Leçon de conduite) is a 1946 French comedy film directed by Gilles Grangier and starring Odette Joyeux, Gilbert Gil and Jean Tissier. The film's sets were designed by Paul-Louis Boutié.

Main cast
Odette Joyeux as Micheline
Gilbert Gil as Jacques
Jean Tissier as Frédo
André Alerme as M. Granval
Bernard La Jarrige as Roland
Max Révol as Alexandre
Max Dalban as Mario
Anne-Marie Hunebelle
Félix Claude
Renée Vos as Danielle
Pierre Magnier as M. Derlancourt
Maurice Baquet as Jean
Yves Deniaud as Angélo

References

External links

1946 comedy films
French comedy films
Films directed by Gilles Grangier
French black-and-white films
1940s French-language films
1940s French films